Oxymeris fatua is a species of sea snail, a marine gastropod mollusc in the family Terebridae, the auger snails.

Description
The size of the adult shell varies between 30 mm and 81 mm.

Distribution
This species occurs in the Atlantic Ocean off the island Boa Vista, Cape Verde.

References

 Bratcher T. & Cernohorsky W.O. (1987). Living terebras of the world. A monograph of the recent Terebridae of the world. American Malacologists, Melbourne, Florida & Burlington, Massachusetts. 240pp
 Terryn Y. (2007). Terebridae: A Collectors Guide. Conchbooks & NaturalArt. 59pp + plates

External links
 

Terebridae
Gastropods of Cape Verde
Fauna of Boa Vista, Cape Verde
Gastropods described in 1844